Randers FC is a professional football club based in Randers, East Jutland, Denmark, that plays in the Danish Superliga, the top flight of the Danish football league system. Founded on 1 January 2003, the club builds upon the license of Randers Freja, a former three-time Danish Cup winning team.  the club had won the Danish Cup twice in its history. Randers plays its matches at the 10,300-capacity Cepheus Park Randers.

History
The club was formed on 1 January 2003, as a collaboration between six local Randers-clubs; Dronningborg Boldklub (founded 1928), Hornbæk Sportsforening (founded 1945), Kristrup Boldklub (founded 1908), Randers Freja (founded 1898), Randers KFUM (founded 1920) and Vorup Frederiksberg Boldklub (founded 1930), continuing Randers Freja's (at the time) 1st division-team.

First years and Cup success
In the first season as a newly created club, Randers ended in fourth place in the Viasat Sport Division with 51 points. The captain of the Denmark national team which won UEFA Euro 1992, Lars Olsen, was coach of the team. The following year, the team ended in second place with 66 points and was promoted to the country's best league, the SAS Liga.

With only 24 points in 2004–05 season in the SAS Liga, Randers finished in last place. In the 2005–06 season, however, Randers redeemed itself, securing promotion back to the SAS League with 61 points while also winning the Danish Cup with a 1–0 victory over Esbjerg in the final at Parken Stadium on 11 May 2006. Randers was the first team since 1974 who managed to win the Danish Cup although playing in the second-highest league in Denmark.

In mid-2005, the club brought in former Denmark national team midfielder Stig Tøfting on a free transfer, after AGF, his childhood-club, refused to let him play (even for free) due to his violent background with several sentences.
Tøfting was appointed Assistant Coach in November 2006.

In the 2006–07 season, Randers finished in eighth place with 38 points, as well as participation in the UEFA Cup the season before, where the club met ÍA of Iceland, FBK Kaunas of Lithuania and major club Fenerbahçe from Turkey.

Before the start of the 2007–08 season, Randers signed former England national team player Colin Todd as its new manager. Randers started the season in great fashion, winning its first four matches (most notably a 5–0 win against Aalborg BK).

In the second half of the 2007–08 season, Randers continued to improve in the Danish league. With new signings Marc Nygaard and Søren Berg, expectations grew as the season progressed, and Randers ultimately finished in sixth place following a 2–1 win against Brøndby IF in the final matchday of the season.

The 2008–09 season started in promising fashion for the club, recording a 3–1 win against the local rivals AGF. Randers continued its solid start with a 1–1 a draw with Copenhagen. In the third round, Randers was to play Brøndby away; the club had never defeated Brøndby away before. Randers won 0–3 following goals from Carsten Fredgaard, Bedi Buval and Tidiane Sane. After the five first rounds, Randers was still undefeated, though at the winter break Randers was placed mid-table.

Up and down years
On 4 November 2008 Randers announced that former Danish international John "Faxe" Jensen would become its new manager from 1 July following the ending of Colin Todd's contract. Todd, however, expressed his frustration about how Randers had dealt with the situation and openly criticised the club for putting him in a difficult situation.

Jensen ended up taking the place as manager six months before schedule due to the club having reached an agreement with the then present manager Todd. Jensen was officially announced new manager on 5 January. He started his time in Randers in great fashion, winning the first league game of the season against local rivals AGF 2–1. However, the club failed to sustain the winning form when they went to draw against Vejle BK and thereafter lost the following three games to the top three sides OB, Copenhagen and BIF. The team's losing streak culminated in a 1–6 to Nordsjælland.

The club, however, responded well to the losing streak and won the next five games, ironically setting a new club winning streak. The season ended with a 3–3 draw away against Danish champions Copenhagen and a fifth-place finish, it highest league rank in club history. Marc Nygaard claimed the golden boot for 16 goals during the season. Morten Nordstrand was later credited for a goal on penalty in the final match, and also had a goal tally of 16, but Nygaard was awarded the title as he was the first to reach the 16 goals.

Randers and Faxe decided that Tøfting was not the right choice as assistant manager, and, on 1 May 2009, the club announced that Tøfting's contract would not be extended. On 2 June, the club announced that two of Jensen's colleagues from the Euro 1992-winning Danish side – Henrik Larsen and Flemming Povlsen – as its new assistant managers; Larsen was named first assistant manager while Povlsen as assistant focused on the club's attack. However, after a catastrophic start to the 2009–10 season with only 2 points earned from 11 league games, Jensen and his assistants were released from their contracts.

Ove Christensen was appointed new head coach for Randers for the remainder of the 2009–10 season. He was given the objective to save Randers from relegation, although Randers was projected to be relegated at the winter break by the media and experts. However, a historic comeback with 16 games without defeat meant that its topflight status was to be decided on the final day of the season. A loss to Brøndby would mean that if AGF won its game against OB, the best team of the spring season would be relegated. OB won 0–3 and Randers lost its first match in the second half of the season 1–3, ensuring Randers kept their top-flight status. Yura Movsisyan was arguably the key in Randers' survival, as he scored 7 goals in 13 games.

When Ove Christensen arrived, he gave the squad an overhaul and nine players were released or sold in the winter break of 2009–10 season. He also made several signings: Anders Egholm from SønderjyskE, Morten Karlsen from Nordsjælland and Søren Jensen on loan from Odd Grenland. Christensen signed a new one-year contract as head coach on 17 May 2010.

In the following season, however, Christensen could not follow up on the success and was fired after a loss to Brøndby. Peter Elstrup and Allan Kuhn were Brough in as caretakers but could not prevent Randers' relegation at the end of the season. Michael Hemmingsen was named new head coach with the first task to bring Randers back to the Superliga. With Hemmingsen as head coach, Randers ended the 2011–12 season in second place in the Danish 1st division, thereby earning promotion back to the Superliga.

League success and Europa League qualification
Despite having earned promotion to the Danish Superliga, Hemmingsen was replaced as head coach by former Randers coach Colin Todd, who returned to the club following his coaching spell from 2007 to 2009. Randers did well in its first season after being promoted, ending its 2012–13 league campaign in third place, the club's best ever league finish. The team also reached the final in the Danish Cup, but lost 0–1 to Esbjerg. Nonetheless, the league result meant that Randers was to participate in the UEFA Europa League. It entered the tournament in the third round of qualifying, where it met Rubin Kazan. Randers, however, lost the home match 1–2 and the away match 0–2, thus failing to qualify for the group stage.

European record
During the 2006–07 season, Randers managed to qualify for the UEFA Cup as Danish Cup winners. During the 2009–10 season, the club was invited to participate in the Europa League due to its second place in the Danish league Fair Play ranking – behind 2008–09 champions Copenhagen, which claimed Denmark's UEFA Champions League spot. During the 2010–11 season, the club participated in the Europa League due to its second-place finish in the Danish league Fair Play ranking – behind 2009–10 champions Copenhagen, which again claimed the Champions League spot.

Stadium

Randers Stadium
Randers Stadium was founded in 1961. It was built to hold 18,000 spectators and in 1969 a record of 16,500 people attended the UEFA Cup loss against 1. FC Köln.

2012 rebuild
The stadium was rebuilt in 2012 and renamed AutoC Park with a capacity of 10,300 spectators. It was built by C. F. Møller Architects and is established on the former Randers Stadium site. On 22 September 2015, it was announced that local company BioNutria had bought the name rights of the stadium until 31 October 2018. On 14 November 2018, it was announced that Cepheus group had bought the name rights of the stadium for 3 years.

The new stadium attendance record after the stadium was rebuilt, is 9,947, set against Aarhus GF on 6 October 2019

Supporters
The largest supporter group is Nordtribunen (i.e. The North Tribune), however there are more factions within the fandom of Randers.

Honours
Danish Superliga
Third place: 2012–13
Danish Cup
Winners: 2005–06, 2020–21
Runners-up: 2012–13
UEFA Fair Play League
Winners: 2009, 2010

Records
Most games played: 223  Mads Fenger

Most goals: 41  Ronnie Schwartz

Biggest league win: 5–0 Randers  – AAB (in 2007)

Biggest league loss: 1–6 Randers  – Nordsjælland (in 2009), SønderjyskE – Randers FC (in 2012)

Highest attendance(home): 11,824 Randers  – Brøndby

Longest run without defeat: 16 (29 November 2009 – 5 May 2010)

Longest winning streak: 5 (13 April 2010 – 3 May 2010)

Longest run without a win: 18 (31 May 2009 – 29 November 2009)

Players

Squad

Out on loan

Managers
 Lars Olsen (1 Jan 2003 – 24 Jan 2007)
 Colin Todd (1 July 2007 – 5 Jan 2009)
 John "Faxe" Jensen (5 Jan 2009 – 6 Oct 2009)
 Ove Christensen (7 Oct 2009 – 26 Apr 2011)
 Peter Elstrup (interim) (27 Apr 2011 – 30 June 2011)
 Michael Hemmingsen (1 July 2011 – 5 July 2012)
 Colin Todd (5 July 2012 – 30 June 2016)
 Ólafur Kristjánsson (1 July 2016 – 5 Oct 2017)
 Ricardo Moniz (8 Oct 2017 – 26 Jan 2018)
 Rasmus Bertelsen (26 Jan 2018 – 30 June 2018)
 Thomas Thomasberg (1 July 2018 – )

Staff
Management

Team

Shirt sponsors

2003 – 2005–06: Nike

2006–07 – 2009–10: Umbro

2010–11 – 2012–13: H2O

2013–14 – 2014–15: Warrior

2015–16 – : Puma

League statistics

References

External links

 Official site
 News about Randers FC
 Statistics site

 
Football clubs in Denmark
Association football clubs established in 2003
Randers
2003 establishments in Denmark